The 2003 Sundance Film Festival took place from January 16 to January 26, 2003. American Splendor, a biopic of comic-book author Harvey Pekar, won the grand-jury prize. Steve Zahn and Maggie Gyllenhaal presented the awards in a ceremony televised live on the Sundance Channel.

Unseasonably warm weather attracted record numbers of attendees, among them musician Bob Dylan.

Non-competition features

Midnight
 Dysfunktional Family
 Girls Will Be Girls
 The Hebrew Hammer
 Nightstalker
 Rolling Kansas
 Spun
 Stoked: The Rise and Fall of Gator

Awards

 Grand Jury Prize: Documentary – Capturing the Friedmans
 Grand Jury Prize: Dramatic – American Splendor
 Audience Award: Documentary – My Flesh and Blood
 Audience Award: Dramatic – The Station Agent
 Special Jury Prize for Emotional Truth – All the Real Girls
 Special Jury Prize for Emotional Truth – What Alice Found
 Special Jury Prize for Performance – Patricia Clarkson, The Station Agent; Pieces of April; All the Real Girls
 Special Jury Prize for Performance – Charles Busch, Die, Mommie, Die!
 Documentary Directing Award – Jonathan Karsh, My Flesh and Blood
 Dramatic Directing Award – Catherine Hardwicke, Thirteen
 Waldo Salt Screenwriting Award: U.S. Dramatic – Tom McCarthy, The Station Agent
 Excellence in Cinematography Award: Documentary – Dana Kupper, Gordon Quinn, and Peter Gilbert, Stevie
 Excellence in Cinematography Award: Dramatic – Quattro Noza
 The Freedom of Expression Award went to What I Want My Words to Do to You
 Special Jury Prize for Documentary – The Murder of Emmett Till
 Special Jury Prize for Documentary – A Certain Kind of Death

References

External links
2003 Sundance Film Festival at the Internet Movie Database

2003
2003 film festivals
2003 in Utah
2003 in American cinema
Sundance
January 2003 events in the United States